Neil Stiles is a British magazine executive who is a former CEO of Variety, Inc.

As President of Variety, Inc.,  Stiles was responsible for the global business operations of the Variety franchise including Variety, the former Daily Variety, the former Daily Variety Gotham, and Variety.com.  Additionally, he oversaw MarketCast, a provider of market research for the film and television industries.

Stiles began his career as a music industry journalist in the mid-1970s and moved into sales management and publishing management positions throughout the 1980s.

Before joining Variety in 2008, Stiles was the UK Division Managing Director of Variety's parent company, Reed Business Information.  Stiles oversaw several online initiatives; he was CEO of eMedia, an online marketing business, and XpertHR, an online human resources tool.  In addition, he managed the print and electronic portfolios of Personnel Today, Hairdressers Journal International, Travel Weekly, Commercial Motor, Motor Transport, Truck and Driver and Utility Week.  Stiles also served as Chief Revenue Officer and was responsible for pricing consulting internally, as well as launching the division's digital advertising network.

On October 12, 2012, the ailing Variety, Co. was purchased by Penske Media Corporation.  Soon after the purchase, Stiles left the company.

After moving to Los Angeles in 2008, Neil was elected to the Board of British Academy of Film and Television Arts Los Angeles.  He has also joined the Boards of LA's BEST, an after school enrichment program, and BritWeek, a charitable organization celebrating British contributions to the Los Angeles community.  Stile has judged the One Show Awards, a celebration of product integration within programming, and the LARC Awards, a recognition of innovation within the Los Angeles Urban landscape.  He speaks frequently at conferences on the issues of changing revenue models in democratized distribution channels and pricing in the online space.

References

External links
 Variety: Publishing change at Variety
 Reed Business Information: Neil Stiles' Bio
 BtoB Online: Who's Who in Business Publishing
 Hey Guys: Exclusive Interview with Neil Stiles

Variety (magazine) people
Living people
Year of birth missing (living people)